Piecewo  is a settlement in the administrative district of Gmina Wejherowo, within Wejherowo County, Pomeranian Voivodeship, in northern Poland. It belongs to the sołectwo of Bieszkowice.

References

Piecewo